Tajuria deudorix yuhkichii is a subspecies of the butterfly Tajuria deudorix in the family Lycaenidae. The subspecies was first described by Hisakazu Hayashi in 1984. It is found in Palawan in the Philippines.

References

 Hayashi, Hisakazu, 1984: New Synonyms, New Status, New Combinations, New Species and New Subspecies of Butterflies from the Philippines and Indonesia (Lepidoptera: Satyridae, Riodinidae, Lycaenidae). IWASE.2:9-34.
 Treadaway, Colin G., 1955: Checklist of the butterflies of the Philippine Islands. Nachrichten des Entomologischen Vereins Apollo, Suppl. 14: 7–118.

 , 2012: Revised checklist of the butterflies of the Philippine Islands (Lepidoptera: Rhopalocera). Nachrichten des Entomologischen Vereins Apollo, Suppl. 20: 1-64.

Butterflies described in 1984
Tajuria
Butterfly subspecies